Bethel Memorial Church, also known as Bethel Baptist Memorial Church, is a historic Baptist church building located at White Post, Clarke County, Virginia.  It replaced an earlier log Quaker meeting house, used by the Baptist congregation from 1808. Bethel was built between 1833 and 1836, and is a two-story, rectangular brick church in the Federal style.  It has a front gable roof.  The interior features many well-preserved elements including oil lamps installed in 1874 and grain painted pews. The front of the church features separate entrance doors for men and women. Also on the property is a contributing church cemetery.

It was listed on the National Register of Historic Places in 1991.

References

Baptist churches in Virginia
Churches on the National Register of Historic Places in Virginia
National Register of Historic Places in Clarke County, Virginia
Federal architecture in Virginia
Churches completed in 1836
Buildings and structures in Clarke County, Virginia